Louis Pombi Litinda  is a Congolese retired footballer. A goalkeeper, he represented Zaire in international competition, including at the 1972 Africa Cup of Nations in Cameroon. He appeared in one match in the tournament, a 5–2 loss to Cameroon in the third place match. He was also a member of the Zairian squad in a 1971 tour of the Netherlands and Belgium.

In the 1970s, Pombi played for AS Vita Club.

Pombi represented Zaire in international competition as late as 1979, appearing in a 1980 African Cup of Nations qualifying match versus Guinea in Kinshasa.

References

Living people
Association football goalkeepers
Democratic Republic of the Congo footballers
Democratic Republic of the Congo international footballers
1972 African Cup of Nations players
AS Vita Club players
Year of birth missing (living people)